|}

This is a list of electoral district results of the 1947 Western Australian election.

Results by Electoral district

Albany

Avon

Beverley

Boulder

Brown Hill-Ivanhoe

Bunbury

Canning

Claremont

Collie

East Perth 

 Preferences were not distributed.

Forrest

Fremantle

Gascoyne

Geraldton

Greenough 

 The Liberal candidate David Brand had won the seat from Labor at the 1945 Greenough state by-election.

Guildford-Midland

Hannans

Irwin-Moore 

 Preferences were not distributed.

Kalgoorlie

Kanowna

Katanning

Kimberley

Leederville

Maylands

Middle Swan

Mount Hawthorn

Mount Magnet

Mount Marshall

Murchison

Murray-Wellington

Nedlands

Nelson

Northam

North Perth

North-East Fremantle

Perth 

 Preferences were not distributed.

Pilbara 

 Includes the casting vote of the returning officer. The result was challenged and resulted in the 1947 Pilbara state by-election.

Pingelly

Roebourne

South Fremantle

Subiaco

Sussex

Swan 

 Swan was won in a by-election by Independent candidate Ray Owen upon the death of sitting Country member Richard Sampson.

Toodyay

Victoria Park 

 Victoria Park was won by the Independent member William Read at the 1945 by-election upon the death of the sitting Labor member Howard Stirling.

Wagin

West Perth

Williams-Narrogin

Yilgarn-Coolgardie

York

See also 

 1947 Western Australian state election
 Members of the Western Australian Legislative Assembly, 1947–1950

References 

Results of Western Australian elections
1947 elections in Australia